Mangalapuzha bridge is a bridge in Aluva, Kerala, India. This bridge connects Desom and Aluva town. This bridge is situated 3 km away from Marthanda Varma Bridge and is a part of NH 47 Highway passing through Aluva. Aluva Pontifical seminary is situated near this bridge.

A new bridge was constructed parallel to old bridge to widen the NH47. The construction of the new bridge was done by Techni Bharathi Ltd in 2004.

This bridge is situated 9 km from Cochin International Airport near Desom.

References

External links
Youtube Video

Buildings and structures in Ernakulam district
Bridges completed in 2004
Bridges in Kerala
Transport in Ernakulam district